Jan Villerius (8 February 19397 May 2013) was a Dutch football player.

Club career
A big defender or midfielder, Villerius played for Xerxes with future Feyenoord-legend Coen Moulijn before making his debut for Sparta in December 1958. He won the 1958–59 Eredivisie league title with them in his first year when he played alongside Sparta greats Tonny van Ede and Tinus Bosselaar.

He later moved to ADO, whom he captained and for whom he played over 300 matches and was part of the ADO side that played as San Francisco Gales in the United Soccer Association in 1967, Dick Advocaat being one of his teammates.

International career
Villerius earned his one and only cap for the Netherlands in an October 1962 friendly match against Belgium.

Retirement and death
After his playing career, he became an amateur football coach. Villerius died after a long battle against cancer on 7 May 2013 at the age of 74.

References

External links
 Career stats - Voetbal International
 Biography - Haagsche Voetbalhistorie 

1939 births
2013 deaths
Footballers from Rotterdam
Association football midfielders
Dutch footballers
Netherlands international footballers
Sparta Rotterdam players
ADO Den Haag players
San Francisco Golden Gate Gales players
Dutch expatriate footballers
Expatriate soccer players in the United States
Deaths from cancer in the Netherlands
United Soccer Association players